Kamala Sankaram (born 1978) is an American composer, vocalist, playwright and actress.  Based in New York City, she is best known for chamber operas about women who find themselves in situations where they are forced to confront patriarchal structures.  Sankaram is also known for incorporating the latest technologies (e.g., virtual reality) and discussing the social effects of technology in musical theater works.

Life 
The daughter of an Indian father and a white American mother, Sankaram was born in Orange County, California, and grew up largely in Ramona, a small town in San Diego County.  She took some piano lessons as a child, but her interest soon turned to theater.  She said, “I was in a theater show called Choice in Southern California.  I would do these big dance and song numbers and that’s what got me even more interested in it. I wanted to be on Broadway!” 

In 1996, Sankaram moved to New York to attend Sarah Lawrence College.  After graduation, her father, who wanted her daughter to become a physician, “offered to pay for graduate school as long as she didn’t study music.” This led Sankaram to undertake a doctorate in cognitive psychology at the New School of Social Research.  Her 2013 dissertation examines how interactivity affects the way people process information on the Internet.  She concludes, “Reading on the Internet may also have the potential to create a more positive effect on reading in the form of deeper information processing.  In particular, reading may be enhanced by the presence of some form of interactive, two-way communication, such as a comments section.”

Musical career 
Sankaram’s musical career began taking off as she was finishing her Ph.D., ironically because, as she says, “I couldn’t get any grant money to research on Twitter, but people started asking me to write more music.” As a composer, her current catalogue includes eleven musical theatrical works, some of which have been produced by the Washington National Opera, the Los Angeles Opera and the Houston Grand Opera, and numerous vocal and instrumental chamber works.  With regards to her musical inspirations, Sankaram stated, “I have played as much rock and avant jazz as I have classical music, and those connections are found in the music I write.”  In the same interview, she also said, “I grew up hearing a lot Carnatic music in my house, so I think that those modalities are always present.  As far as specific influences, they range from [Anthony] Braxton to Strauss to Radiohead and Pink Floyd.” She also loves Bollywood songs, and incorporates elements of this style in many works.

As a coloratura soprano, Sankaram has starred in many of her own works, and performed with Anthony Braxton, Meredith Monk, the Philip Glass Ensemble, and the Wooster Group.  She is also the leader of Bombay Rickey, a five-piece band that evokes 1960’s movie soundscapes through a fusion of surf music, cumbia, Bollywood, film noir jazz, Spaghetti Western, and opera.

Sankaram teaches musical composition at State University of New York-Purchase, and is co-Artistic Director of Experiments in Opera, a New York-based company that believes in “re-writing the history of opera” through producing new works that are “adventurous and fun, focused on strong and intimate storytelling.” With regard to the latter role, she said, “We tend to hire those that we can think of quickly, and we tend to be able to think of people who are most similar to us more quickly than people who are not.  As both a woman and a person of South Asian descent, my worldview and my network are different than many people in the field.  Therefore, as a gatekeeper, I see my role as inviting people to the table who may not have had an invitation before.”

Selected commissions and awards

Commissions 
 Washington National Opera
 Houston Grand Opera
 Beth Morrison Projects
 Prototype Festival
 Opera on Tap (for The Parksville Murders)
 Opera Memphis
 Brooklyn Youth Chorus

Awards 
 American Theater Wing: Jonathan Larson Award
 New York Innovative Theatre Awards: Outstanding Production of a Musical (Miranda)
 Independent Music Awards Vox Pop: Best Eclectic Award (Bombay Rickey’s Cinefonia)

Grants 
 National Endowment for the Arts
 Opera America
 Kevin Spacey Foundation
 The MAP Fund

Residencies and fellowships 
 MacDowell Colony
 The Watermill Center
 The Civilians
 HERE Arts Center (for the musical Miranda)
 CAP21
 Con Edison/Exploring the Metropolis
 The Hermitage
 American Lyric Theater

Bibliography 
 Suzanne G. Cusick, “Women in Impossible Situations”: Missy Mazzoli and Kamala Sankaram on Sexual Violence in Opera.” Journal of the American Musicological Society, Vol. 71, No. 1 (Spring 2018), pp. 243-248.
 Hillary LaBonte, “Analyzing Gender Inequality in Contemporary Opera.” D.M.A. Dissertation: Bowling Green State University, 2019.
 Sean Sonderegger, “New World, New Music: Creative Music Communities in New Haven and Woodstock in the 1970s and Their Legacies.” Ph.D. Dissertation: Wesleyan University, 2018.
 Kamala Sankaram & Michael F. Schober, “Reading a Blog When Empowered to Comment: Posting, Lurking, and Noninteractive Reading.” Discourse Processes Vol. 52, No. 5-6 (2015), pp. 406–433.
 Kamala Sankaram, “Finding a Voice: The Story of Mukhtar Mai.” International Arts Manager, January 10, 2014. http://www.internationalartsmanager.com/blog/finding-voice-story-mukhtar-mai.html

External links 
 Official site

References 

1978 births
Living people
People from Ramona, San Diego County, California
Classical musicians from California
American women classical composers
21st-century classical composers
American actresses of Indian descent
American musicians of Indian descent
American classical composers
Musicians from Orange County, California
Sarah Lawrence College alumni
The New School faculty
State University of New York at Purchase faculty
Asian American music
American women academics
21st-century American women
21st-century American composers
21st-century women composers